Nevermore, is a 2006 film written and directed and co-written by . The film was largely produced and shot by students of the Filmakademie Baden-Württemberg.

Plot synopsis
The film is in the form of a fairy tale, set in 19th century rural Germany, although location shooting was actually in Denmark. A young boy called Jonas Block (Leonard Proxauf) loves the magical stories told to him by his father, Helge (Rolf Becker), an impoverished fisherman. After his father dies, the orphaned Jonas is taken in by the austere clergyman Pfarrer Ekdahl (Sylvester Groth), but is subjected to harsh discipline and neglect. When a travelling circus arrives in the village, the ringmaster, Grido (Manni Laudenbach), befriends Jonas and teaches him to believe in the power of dreams and imagination.

Awards
 2006 Best New Director Promotional Award for Toke Constantin Hebbeln, Hof International Film Festival
 2006 German Film Promotional Award for Manuel Bickenbach, Hof International Film Festival
 2006 Best Foreign Drama Festival Prize for Toke Constantin Hebbeln, Hollywood International Student Film Festival
 2007 Producer prize for Manuel Bickenbach, Sehsüchte, Potsdam
 2007 Honorary Foreign Film for Toke Constantin Hebbeln, 34th Annual Student Academy Awards, Academy of Motion Picture Arts and Sciences
 2007 Rated "particularly valuable", Filmbewertungsstelle Wiesbaden

External links
 
 Cinema Liberated - Nimmermeer (Nevermore) 2006 Germany

References

2006 films
2006 drama films
German drama films
2000s German-language films
Films shot in Denmark
2000s German films